, also sometimes credited as , was a Japanese film actor active from the 1930s to 1971. With hopes of starting a business, he traveled to the United States in 1923 and studied at Columbia University. He also studied at the Paramount Studios acting school and eventually began working in Hollywood, appearing in films by Howard Hawks and William Wellman. He returned to Japan in 1933 and co-starred in the Photo Chemical Laboratories (PCL) film Horoyoi jinsei. He later appeared in foreign films under the name Henry Okawa.

He is best known for Moyuru ōzora (1940), Dawn of Freedom (1944) Tokyo File 212 (1951), Floating Clouds (1955) and The Bridge on the River Kwai (1957).

Partial filmography

  (1933) - Asao
  (1933)
  (1934)
  (1934)
  (1934)
  (1934)
  (1935)
Three Sisters With Maiden Hearts (1935) - Aoyama
Wife! Be Like a Rose! (1935) - Seiji, Kimiko's boyfriend
  (1935) - Kokichi
The Girl in the Rumor (1935) - Shintaro
  (1936) - Student, Obata
  (1936) - Asaji Amanuma
  (1936)
  (1936) - Ogawa
  (1937)
  (1937)
  (1937)
  (1937)
  (1937)
  (1938)
  (1938)
  (1938) - Matsuzaki
  (1938)
  (1939) - Gengo Ôtaka
  (1939)
  (1939)
  (1940)
  (1940)
  (1940)
  (1940) - Shinjiro Ine's husband
  (1941) - Takeshi Yoshino
  (1942)
 The Sky of Hope (1942) - Okada
  (1942)
  (1942) - Harada, pilot
  (1942)
  (1944) 
Tokyo File 212 (1951) 
Oriental Evil (1951)
  (1951) - Koyama
  (1952) - Takada
  (1952)
Geisha Girl (1952) - Police Inspector 
Eagle of the Pacific (1953)
  (1954)
  (1954)
  (1954)
Floating Clouds (1955) - Isha
  (1955) - Clerk
Three Stripes in the Sun (1955) - Father Yoshida
The Bridge on the River Kwai (1957) - Captain Kanematsu
Stopover Tokyo (1957) - Lt. Afumi (uncredited)
The Mysterians (1957) - Person at Board Meeting
The Wind Cannot Read (1958) - Lt. Nakamura
  The Road to the West (1959)
The Big Wave (1961) - Yukio's Father
Marines, Let's Go (1961) - Yoshida (hotel manager)
  (1962) - Kyûdayû Mase
  (1963) - Quyen
Ghidorah, the Three-Headed Monster (1964) - Astronomer
Destroy All Monsters (1968) - Engineer 
Hændeligt uheld (1971) - Kawasaki (final film role)

References

External links
 

1905 births
1971 deaths
Actors from Saitama Prefecture
Japanese male film actors
Columbia University alumni
Place of death unknown